Local elections are scheduled to be held in Greece on between 8 and 15 October 2023. Voters will elect representatives to the country's local authorities, comprising 13 regions and 325 municipalities.

References 

Local elections in Greece
2023 elections in Greece
2023 in Greek politics